Start a Fire is the second single from Ryan Star's debut album 11:59. It debuted at #36 on the Adult Pop Songs chart and peaked at #17.

Charts (2010)

References

2010 singles
2010 songs
Atlantic Records singles
Songs written by Ido Zmishlany